The Roman Catholic Church in Belarus, united in the Episcopal Conference of Belarus, a Slavic ex-Soviet country in Eastern Europe, is presently only composed of one Latin ecclesiastical province, comprising the Metropolitan of Minsk-Mohilev and his three Suffragan dioceses.

There are no Eastern Catholic, pre-diocesan or other exempt jurisdictions.

There is an Apostolic Nunciature to Belarus as papal diplomatic representation (embassy-level) in the national capital Minsk.

Current Latin Dioceses

Ecclesiastical Province of Minsk-Mohilev 
 Metropolitan Archdiocese of Minsk-Mohilev 
 Roman Catholic Diocese of Grodno 
 Roman Catholic Diocese of Pinsk
 Roman Catholic Diocese of Vitebsk

Defunct jurisdictions

Latin defunct jurisdiction 
 Metropolitan Roman Catholic Archdiocese of Mohilev (1783-1991, merged into Metropolitan Archdiocese of Minsk–Mohilev, losing its Russian territories to establish Apostolic Administration of European Russia and Apostolic Administration of Novosibirsk)

Eastern Catholic defunct jurisdictions

Ruthenian Catholic defunct jurisdictions 
 Ruthenian Catholic Eparchy of Pinsk–Turaŭ (1596-1795, suppressed)
 Ruthenian Catholic Archeparchy of Polotsk–Vitebsk (1596-1839, suppressed)

Ukrainian Catholic defunct jurisdictions 
 Ukrainian Catholic Eparchy of Volodymyr–Brest (1596-1833, suppressed)
 Ukrainian Catholic Apostolic Exarchate of Belarus (1942-1944, suppressed)

Sources and external links 
 GCatholic - here circumscription changes
 Catholic-hierarchy

Belarus
Catholic dioceses